High Water Recording Company is a blues record label founded in 1979 by David Evans and Memphis State University.

The label first issued only singles. Since 1983 it released LPs of recordings by blues and gospel musicians from the Memphis area produced by Evans. Almost all recordings since 1997 were re-released on Hightone Records. In 2008 HighTone was bought by Shout! Factory,

Discography

Singles
 408 Raymond Hill / Lillie Hill
 409 Jessie Mae Hemphill
 410 R. L. Burnside and the Sound Machine
 411 Ranie Burnette
 412 The Fieldstones
 413 The Fieldstones
 414 The Jubirt Sisters
 415 Little Applewhite
 416 Hammie Nixon
 417 The Hollywood All Stars
 418 Junior Kimbrough And the Soul Blues Boys
 419 The Harmonizers
 420 The Gospel Writers
 421 Hezekiah and the House Rockers
 422 Little Applewhite
 423 Uncle Ben and his Nephews
 424 Waynell Jones
 425 Jessie Mae Hemphill
 426 Huebert Crawford and the King Riders Band

LPs
 1001 The Fieldstones
 1002 Happy in the Service of the Lord (various)
 1003 Hammie Nixon
 1004 The Pattersonaires
 1005 Spirit of Memphis Quartet
 1006 The Blues Busters
 1007 Forth
 1008 The Jubirt Sisters
 1009 The Hollywood All Stars
 1010 Chicago Bob and the Shadows
 1011 Hezekiah and the House Rockers
 1012 Jessie Mae Hemphill
 ???? Southern Comfort – First Concert Jazz Ensemble of Memphis State University
 ???? The Jazz Ensembles of Memphis State University

CDs (HighTone)
 HMG 6501 R. L. Burnside: Sound Machine Groove
 HMG 6502 Jessie Mae Hemphill: Feelin' Good
 HMG 6503 Junior Kimbrough: Do the Rump!
 HMG 6504 The Pattersonaires: Why Not Try My God
 HMG 6505 The Fieldstones: Memphis Blues Today!
 HMG 6506 Chicago Bob and the Shadows: Just Your Fool
 HMG 6507 Spirit of Memphis Quartet: Traveling On
 HMG 6508 Jessie Mae Hemphill: She-Wolf
 HMG 6509 Hammie Nixon: Tappin' That Thing
 HMG 6510 The Harps of Melody: Sing and Make Melody Unto the Lord
 HMG 6511 Hezekiah and the House Rockers: Going to California
 HMG 6512 The Blues Busters: Busted
 HMG 6513 V.A.: Deep South Blues
 HMG 6514 The Pattersonaires: Book of the Seven Seals
 HMG 6515 The Jubirt Sisters: Ladies Sing the Blues
 HMG 6516 V.A.: Happy in the Service of the Lord Volume 1
 HMG 6517 V.A.: Happy in the Service of the Lord Volume 2
 HMG 6518 The Hollywood All Stars: Hard Hitting Blues from Memphis
 HMG 6519 The Fieldstones: Mud Island Blues
 HMG 6520 V.A.: Memphis Blues Bands and Singers: the 1980s

References

External links
 Official High Water homepage
 Illustrated High Water discography

American record labels
Record labels established in 1979
Blues record labels